Mark Paul Witton is a British vertebrate palaeontologist, author, and palaeoartist best known for his research and illustrations concerning pterosaurs, the extinct flying reptiles that lived alongside dinosaurs. He has worked with museums and universities around the world to reconstruct extinct animals, including as consultant to the Walking with Dinosaurs franchise and BBC's Planet Dinosaur, and has published several critically acclaimed books on palaeontology and palaeoart.

Witton obtained a palaeobiology and evolution degree, his Ph.D., from the University of Portsmouth, where he currently works as support staff. Witton's scientific research has revolved largely around the habits, behaviors, systematics and nomenclature of pterosaurs. His 2013 book Pterosaurs: Natural History, Evolution, Anatomy explores the anatomy, ecology and extinction of pterosaurs, in addition to being fully illustrated.

Witton's palaeoart is regarded as part of the modern, '"anatomically-rigorous" movement. He has published a book detailing his experience of reconstructing extinct animals in art, and he also published a "handbook" on the interaction of science and art to produce palaeoart, which was released in August 2018.

References

External links
 Twitter

Living people
Paleoartists
Academics of the University of Portsmouth
British palaeontologists
Year of birth missing (living people)